The Arkansas State Police is a state police division of the Arkansas Department of Public Safety and the "premier" law enforcement agency in the State of Arkansas. The Arkansas State Police is responsible for enforcing motor vehicle laws, traffic laws, and criminal laws. The Arkansas State Police serves as an assisting agency to local law enforcement agencies within the State of Arkansas and has statewide authority to conduct law enforcement activities, criminal investigations, and crimes against children investigations.

History 
The Arkansas State Police was created on 19 March 1935 through Act 120 of 1935, which was passed by the Arkansas General Assembly and signed into law by the 30th Governor of Arkansas J.M. Futrell. Upon the creation of the Arkansas State Police in 1935, the agency consisted of approximately thirteen Rangers who were charged with enforcing liquor laws and traffic laws. From its creation in 1935, the Arkansas State Police has been an assisting agency to local law enforcement agencies

State Police Commission
The Arkansas State Police Commission is made up of seven members, appointed by the Governor of Arkansas with the advice and consent of the Arkansas Senate for seven year terms. The commission is responsible for the overall control of the Arkansas State Police.

Current Commissioners:

Chairman: Steve Edwards of Marianna, Arkansas
Vice-Chair: Jeffery Teague of El Dorado, Arkansas 
Secretary: John Allison of Conway, Arkansas
Member: Jim Hinkle of Conway, Arkansas
Member: Ken Reeves of Harrison, Arkansas
Member: Neff Basore of Bella Vista, Arkansas
Member: Mike Akin of Monticello, Arkansas

Organization
Arkansas Governor - Sarah Huckabee Sanders
Arkansas Department of Public Safety Secretary - Mike Hagar
Arkansas State Police Director - Colonel Mike Hagar
Deputy Director - Lieutenant Colonel Mike Kennedy - Administrative Services
Deputy Director - Lieutenant Colonel Jason Aaron - Field Operations

Administrative Services - Major Charles Hubbard
The Administrative Services consists of two of the Division's largest sections, recruiting and training, in addition, Human Resources services for the more than 900 State Police employees. The Arkansas State Police Recruiting Office collects the initial contact forms of all potential recruits and prepares the next generation of State Police Recruits who may enter the department's Training Academy. The training officers assigned to the division develop and teach both curriculum for new recruits as well as in-service training for incumbent Troopers.
Arkansas State Police Personnel
Employment
Office of Personnel Management
Equal Employment Opportunity Policy
Trooper Recruiters are always searching for the next generation of Arkansas State Troopers. If you're interested in a career among the ranks of Arkansas State Troopers and want to learn more about the job prerequisites, visit the Trooper Recruiting section.

Highway Patrol
Highway Patrol - Major Ron Casey - Commander Western Region
Highway Patrol - Major Position Vacant - Commander Eastern Region
The Highway Patrol Division is the uniformed branch of the Arkansas State Police. It is responsible for traffic supervision, traffic, and criminal law enforcement on the rural highways of Arkansas. The HPD also assist with other incidents to include riots, prison disturbances, labor related disturbances, and providing security at public events.
The Highway Patrol Division is divided into two regions both located at Arkansas State Police, One State Police Plaza Drive, Little Rock, Arkansas:

Criminal Investigations
 Criminal Investigations - Major Stacie Rhoads - Commander
Special Agents assigned to Criminal Investigations, investigate criminal cases initiated by both the Arkansas State Police and local law enforcement agencies.

Crimes Against Children
 Crimes Against Children - Major Jeffrey Drew - Commander
 Crimes Against Children - Kalika Rogers - Investigations Administrator
 Crimes Against Children - Dan Mack - Hotline Administrator
 Investigators assigned to the Crimes Against Children, investigate child maltreatment and criminal cases involving juveniles along with local law enforcement agencies.

Rank structure

Incidents
In 1992, state troopers executed a search warrant without knocking and announcing themselves. The U.S. Supreme Court ruled the action violated the Fourth Amendment in Wilson v. Arkansas.
In 1993, several state troopers claimed that they assisted then Governor Bill Clinton to cover extramarital affairs in what became known as "Troopergate". No official state inquiry was performed.
On March 7, 2006, trooper Larry P. Norman fatally shot Joseph Erin Hamley, an unarmed man with cerebral palsy as he lay on his back. On June 28, 2007, Norman pleaded guilty to negligent homicide based on the dashcam footage and was sentenced to 90 days in jail, 30 days of community service, one year of probation, and a $1,000 fine. Norman served 54 days of his jail sentence. The Arkansas State Police settled a lawsuit on March 5, 2007 with the victim's family for one million dollars.
In July 2020, Senior Cpl. Rodney Dunn performed a PIT maneuver against a pregnant woman during a traffic stop. Shortly thereafter, the woman filed a lawsuit against the department, claiming that she was in the process of pulling over, and that the actions of Dunn were reckless and nearly killed her and her unborn child. The Arkansas State Police has defended the trooper's actions and argue neither he nor the department bear any responsibility for the incident. The Arkansas State Police and the woman have settled the lawsuit in November 2021.

In popular culture
The third season of HBO's True Detective depicted Mahershala Ali and Stephen Dorff as Arkansas State Police detectives.
In the 1973 film White Lightning starring Burt Reynolds, the Arkansas State Police are seen pursuing Reynolds boot legging character, Gator McKlusky.

Notables
 Wayne Hays (fictional)
 Tommy F. Robinson
 Dwight Tosh

See also 
 List of law enforcement agencies in Arkansas
Police misconduct in the United States

References

External links

 

1935 establishments in Arkansas
Government agencies established in 1935
State law enforcement agencies of Arkansas